Covington Municipal Airport  is a city-owned public-use airport located three nautical miles (6 km) north of the central business district of Covington, a city in Newton County, Georgia, United States.

Facilities and aircraft 
It has one runway designated 10/28 with an asphalt surface measuring 5,500 by 75 feet (1,676 x 23 m).

A city-owned FBO is located on the airport offering fuel, parking, and hangar services as well as a passenger terminal, courtesy cars, a lounge, and aircraft maintenance. An independent Part 145 repair station is also available, offering major maintenance, avionics installation, and standard inspections. Aircraft rental is available through the FBO and a local flying club.

For the 12-month period ending December 31, 2020, the airport had 41 operations per day, or about 15,000 per year. All of it was general aviation. At that time, there were 28 aircraft based at this airport: 21 single-engine and 6 multi-engine airplanes and 1 helicopter.

Accidents & Incidents
On April 21, 2022, a Cessna 340 crashed on a training flight in Covington. The two pilots on board were fatally injured. Witnesses reported the plane made a "hard right" turn and started to spiral downwards before impacting a row of parked semitruck trailers. The accident is under investigation.

References

External links 
 

Airports in Georgia (U.S. state)
Buildings and structures in Newton County, Georgia
Transportation in Newton County, Georgia